Ivo Reemnet (born September 25, 1976 in Rotterdam) is a Dutch footballer who played for Eerste Divisie club FC Dordrecht during the 1996-1999 football seasons.

References

Dutch footballers
FC Dordrecht players
Eerste Divisie players
Footballers from Rotterdam
1976 births
Living people
Association football defenders